Phoswich detectors were developed to detect low-intensity, low-energy gamma rays, X-rays, as well as alpha and beta particles efficiently in a higher-energy ambient background.  Some detector designs can measure and separately identify all energies simultaneously.

A phoswich ("phosphor sandwich") is a combination of scintillators with dissimilar pulse shape characteristics optically coupled to each other and to a common PMT (or PMTs).  Pulse shape analysis distinguishes the signals from the two scintillators, identifying in which scintillator the event occurred.

In 2010 development of a monolithic phoswich sensor technology was announced, departing from the discrete designs. This novel development, termed the continuous phoswich scintillator and detector, provides a number of bits of depth-of-interaction (DOI) information, a significant improvement over the 1 to 2 bits available previously with discrete phoswich scintillators.

Phoswich applications are frequently seen in sensitive and low-background radiation sensors used in space research.

References

 Characterization of Phoswich Scintillation Detectors for the Focal Plane Hodoscope of Magnetic Proton Recoil Spectrometers for Fusion Neutrons
 DIGITAL PULSE SHAPE ANALYSIS WITH PHOSWICH DETECTOR S TO SIMPLIFY COINCIDENCE MEASUREMENTS OF RADIOACTIVE XENON
 APPLICATION OF PHOSWICH DETECTORS FOR LUNG COUNTING PLUTONIUM-238
 
 STUDY OF A TRIPLE-LAYER PHOSWICH DETECTOR FOR BETA AND GAMMA SPECTROSCOPY WITH MINIMAL CROSSTALK

External links
 Phoswich Detectors For High Energy Backgrounds (Saint-Gobain)
 Continuous Phoswich scintillators and detectors (Radiation Monitoring Devices, Inc.)

Ionising radiation detectors